Boy From Michigan is the fifth studio album by American musician John Grant. It was released via Partisan Records on June 25, 2021.

Release
In January 2021, Grant released the anti-Trump song "The Only Baby" with an accompanying music video. In March, he released the single "Boy From Michigan" and announced that his upcoming album would share the single's name. In May, the single "Billy" was released. The album was released on June 25, and received acclaim.

Track listing

Personnel

Musicians
 John Grant – vocals, composer, drum programming, piano, synthesizer, synth-bass, synthesizer programming, vocoder, mixing
 Stella Mozgawa – drum programming, drums, percussion
 Paul Alexander – bass
 Stephen Black – clarinet, saxophone
 Euan Hinshelwood – saxophone
 Cate Le Bon – arrangement, bass, clarinet, guitar, percussion, saxophone, synthesizer, synth-bass

Production
 John Grant – production
 Heba Kadry – mastering
 Matt Pence – engineer
 Cate Le Bon – production
 Rhys Atkinson – design
 Samur Khouja – mixing, engineering
 Gil Corral – portraits
 Scott King – art direction
 Casey Raymond – artwork
 Rob Israel – artwork

References

2021 albums
John Grant (musician) albums
Partisan Records albums